The enzyme phosphorylase a phosphatase (EC 3.1.3.17) catalyzes the reaction

[phosphorylase a] + 4 HO  2 [phosphorylase b] + 4 phosphate

It is synonymous with  Protein phosphatase 1. This enzyme belongs to the family of hydrolases, specifically those acting on phosphoric monoester bonds.  The systematic name is [phosphorylase a] phosphohydrolase. Other names in common use include PR-enzyme, phosphorylase a phosphatase, glycogen phosphorylase phosphatase, protein phosphatase C, and type 1 protein phosphatase.

References

 
 
 

EC 3.1.3
Enzymes of unknown structure